Graphic notation, graphical notation or "diagrammatic notation" may refer to:

 Graphic notation (music)
 Graphic notation (dance)
 A diagrammatic notation in mathematical notation
In physics:
 Penrose graphical notation
 Coxeter–Dynkin diagram
 A visual programming language in computing

See also 
 Graphic (disambiguation)